St. Andrew's Church is a Grade II* listed historic parish church in Kinson, Bournemouth, Dorset. The church dates from the 13th century.

Overview 
The church is dedicated to Andrew the Apostle.

References

External links 
 Official website
 St Andrews at Facebook

See also 
 List of churches in Bournemouth

13th-century church buildings in England
Church of England church buildings in Dorset
Churches in Bournemouth
Grade II* listed churches in Dorset